Mikhail Ivanovich Kolyushev (born 28 April 1943) is a retired Soviet cyclist from Tajikistan. He trained in the Dushanbe Dynamo voluntary sports society, and later in Tashkent. He competed at the 1968 Summer Olympics in the 4 km team pursuit and finished in fourth place. He was part of the Soviet teams that won the team pursuit at the 1965 and 1967 UCI Track Cycling World Championships. Between 1965 and 1968 Kolyushev won six national titles in various track events and set a world record in the 1 km track time trial (1:01.32, 1967).

References

1943 births
Living people
Sportspeople from Dushanbe
Tajikistani male cyclists
Olympic cyclists of the Soviet Union
Cyclists at the 1968 Summer Olympics
Soviet male cyclists
Honoured Masters of Sport of the USSR
Dynamo sports society athletes